The 101st Illinois General Assembly convened on January 9, 2019, and adjourned sine die on January 13, 2021. Over that period, it was in session for a total of 99 days.

The membership of the 101st General Assembly was decided by the 2018 elections. That election returned Illinois to a Democratic government trifecta after four years of divided government. The Democratic Party also increased its majority in the Illinois House and Senate.

Legislation 

The 101st General Assembly enacted a total of 673 bills into law. Notable among these was the Illinois Cannabis Regulation and Tax Act, which legalizes and regulates the production, consumption, and sale of cannabis in Illinois. It was approved by both houses by May 31, 2019, and came into effect January 1, 2020.

In 2019, the legislature passed a US$40 billion budget for the state government. The budget was signed into law by the governor on June 5, marking the first budget passed without a veto since the Illinois Budget Impasse of 2015–2017.  The budget was introduced hours before the scheduled end of the spring session. It passed with bipartisan support in the House. In the Senate, it passed on a party-line vote in which all Republicans voted against it because it contained a pay raise for legislators.

On May 31, 2019, Illinois became the eleventh state to pass legislation protecting abortion rights in the state in response to anti-abortion legislation being passed elsewhere. Known as the Illinois Reproductive Health Act, the legislation provides statutory protections for abortions, and rescinds previous legislation that banned some late-term abortions and a 45-year-old law that had made performing such abortions a criminal offense. Under the Reproductive Health Act, women have the "fundamental right" to access abortion services, and a "fertilized egg, embryo, or fetus does not have independent rights". The governor signed the bill into law on June 12, 2019.

In 2020, the legislative calendar was greatly disrupted by the COVID-19 pandemic in Illinois. In mid-March, both houses canceled their then-ongoing sessions. The legislature did not return to Springfield until May 19. In the May session, social distancing was adopted, which required the House to meet at the Bank of Springfield Center rather than the Capitol. The fall veto session was canceled. Due to these disruptions, only three new laws took effect in Illinois on January 1, 2021. These were: an amendment to the Illinois Insurance Code capping out-of-pocket costs for insulin to US$100 per month; an amendment to the Missing Persons Identification Act allowing law enforcement to obtain DNA samples; and a measure expanding the Illinois Address Confidentiality Program to cover victims of sexual assault and stalking.

Senate 

Of the 39 Senate seats up for election in the 2018 election, three changed hands from the Republican to the Democratic Party.

Senate leadership 

At the beginning of the session, the Senate elected John J. Cullerton as president, a position that he had held since 2009. The Senate Democrats elected Kimberly Lightford as majority leader, succeeding James Clayborne. Bill Brady was elected as minority leader.

Cullerton announced in November 2019 that he would resign from the Senate. On January 19, 2020, the Senate unanimously elected Don Harmon as the new president.

Party composition 

The Senate of the 101st General Assembly consisted of 19 Republicans and 40 Democrats.

State Senators

House

Party composition

The House of the 101st General Assembly consisted of 44 Republicans and 74 Democrats. The party composition reflects the results of the 2020 election.

House leadership

State Representatives

Works cited 
"Legislators' Portraits and Biographies", in

References 

2019 in Illinois
2020 in Illinois
Illinois legislative sessions
2019 U.S. legislative sessions
2020 U.S. legislative sessions